Temri (also known as Temari) is a village Gram panchayat of Paikmal block and Padampur subdivision in Bargarh district in the Indian state of Odisha.

Education 
The village has a primary government school up to 7th standard name as  Temri Nodal School  and a High School from 8th to 10th standard.  Temri High School had 174 students .

Geography

The area around Temri is rain-fed and hence is prone to frequent droughts.

Demographics
 India census, Temri had a population of 2093. The male population was 1045 and females population was 1048, Temri has a literacy rate about nearly 61%. Per capita income is very low.

Main Festivals 
As  this village belongs to the western part of the odisha, so as usual the main festival is Nuakhai  and Puspuni. Besides these the village is observing  "Laxmi pooja" festival from last 26 years, which is well known in this region.

References
https://www.facebook.com/Temri-%E0%AC%9F%E0%AD%87%E0%AC%AE%E0%AC%B0%E0%AC%BF-791571270911209/

Cities and towns in Bargarh district